The Western Railway (abbreviated WR) is one of the 19 zones of Indian Railways and is among the busiest railway networks in India, headquartered at Mumbai, Maharashtra. The major railway routes of Indian Railways which come under Western Railways are: Mumbai Central–Ratlam, Mumbai Central–Ahmedabad and Palanpur–Ahmedabad. Vadodara railway station, being the junction point for the Ahmedabad–Mumbai route and the Mumbai–Ratlam route towards New Delhi, is the busiest junction station in Western Railways and one of the busiest junctions of Indian Railways too, while Ahmedabad Division earns highest revenue followed by Mumbai Division and Vadodara Division. Surat railway station is one of the busiest railway station in Western Railway in non-junction category where more than 180 trains pass per day.

Western Railway General Manager's official bungalow 'Bombarci' (abbreviation of Bombay, Baroda and Central India) is located on Altamont road in Cumbala hill, Mumbai.

History
The Western Railway was created on 5 November 1951 by merging several state-owned railways, including the Bombay, Baroda and Central India Railway (BB&CI), and the Saurashtra Railway, Rajputana Railway and Jaipur State Railway. The narrow-gauge lines of Cutch State Railway was also merged into it in 1951.

The BB&CI Railway was itself inaugurated in 1855, starting with the construction of a 29-mile (47-km) broad-gauge track from Ankleshwar to Utran in Gujarat state on the west coast. In 1864, the railway was extended to Mumbai.

Subsequently, the project was further extended beyond Vadodara in a north easterly direction towards Godhra, Ratlam, Nagda and thereafter northwards towards Kota and Mathura, to eventually link with the Great Indian Peninsular Railway, now the Central Railway, which had already started operating in Mumbai in 1853. In 1860 Surat railway station was built and it was first railway station in Asia which is having platform on first floor (above ground level). In 1883, a metre-gauge railway system, initially linking Delhi with Agra, Jaipur and Ajmer, was established.

The first suburban service in Mumbai with steam traction was introduced in April 1867. It was extended to Churchgate in 1870. By 1900 45 trains in each direction were carrying over one million passengers annually.

The railways of several princely states were also integrated into the Western Railway. The Gaekwars of Baroda built the Gaekwar's Baroda State Railway (GBSR), which was merged into the BB&CI in 1949. Several railways of western Gujarat, including the Bhavnagar, Kathiawar, Jamnagar & Dwarka, Gondal, and Morvi railways were merged into the Saurashtra Railway in 1948. The Jodhpur–Bikaner Railway was taken over by Rajasthan state in 1949, after the western portion was ceded to the government of Pakistan.

In 2002, the Jaipur and Ajmer divisions of the Western Railway became part of the newly created North Western Railway, and in April 2003 the Kota division of the Western Railway became part of the newly created West Central Railway.

Present

Western Railway headquarters is in Mumbai's Churchgate station and serves the entire state of Gujarat, some portions of Western Madhya Pradesh, and coastal Maharashtra. The Western coast of India served by Western Railway has a number of ports, most important among them being Kandla, Hajira, Surat, Dahej, Mundra, Okha, Veraval, Porbandar, Bhavnagar in Gujarat state and Mumbai in Maharashtra.

Navapur railway station is unique as it falls in both the states of Gujarat and Maharashtra because both were as a one state of Bombay State before 1960 and after States Reorganization Act the Navapur station was divided equally among Gujarat and Maharashtra. So is the Surat railway station unique. It is Asia's one of the first railway station where the platforms is on the first floor, that is above the ground level. The ticket counter is on the ground floor.

The Western Railway operates Electric multiple units (EMUs) on the Western line of the Mumbai Suburban Railway, which forms part of the Ahmedabad–Mumbai main line. The EMUs ply between Churchgate and Virar (60 km) and is projected to extend the service until Dahanu Road (Services actually started on 16 April 2013), while mainline electrical multiple units (MEMUs) service the section beyond Virar until Dahanu Road (60 km). EMUs are of 12-car or 15-car rakes and are differentiated as slow and fast locals. Slow trains halt at all stations, while fast ones halt at important stations only and are preferable over longer distances. The first electric train on this section was introduced in 1928 between Churchgate and Andheri.

Divisions
 Mumbai WR railway division
 Ahmedabad railway division
 Vadodara railway division
 Ratlam railway division
 Rajkot railway division
 Bhavnagar railway division

Western Railway Connects Statue of Unity
On 17 January 2021, the Statue of Unity came on the railways map. Western Railway connected the Statue of Unity with Broad Gauge electrified line with Mumbai- Delhi main line at Vadodara. The project included gauge conversion of Dabhoi-Chandod section, new line from Chandod to Kevadiya(Statue of Unity) and electrification of Pratapnagar(Vadodara) to Kevadiya. The project was completed in a record time in close coordination with state government by Western Railway. It was inaugurated by Shri Narendra Modi, Prime Minister through video conferencing from New Delhi. 8 inaugural trains were flagged off from various parts of the country on same day. Vistadome coach has been introduced in Ahmedabad-Kevadiya Janshatabdi express.

Heritage Gallery, Mumbai

Conserving heritage, Western Railway has opened Heritage Gallery at its headquarters building at Churchgate, Mumbai. The Gallery has recently been renovated. It is a collection of various models of BB&CI era, the precursor of Western Railway. Many notes of agents of BB&CI dating back to 1860s have also been displayed. Suburban timetable of 1948, steam engine model, signalling equipment, Model of 1928 EMUs, working model of Auxiliary Warning System, etc. have been beautifully displayed.

The gallery gives an insight about the development of lines on Western Region of India. The BB&CI map dating back to 1930s shows us that the Western line started from Mumbai via Vadodara, Ratlam connected GIP Railway at Mathura to reach Delhi and further Peshawar. The Frontier Mail (Golden Temple Mail) used to run up to Peshawar. The Gallery is open for public free of cost during working hours and on special occasions.

Major routes

Major stations

Loco sheds
 Electric Loco Shed, Vadodara
 Electric Loco Shed, Valsad
 Diesel Loco Shed, Vatva
 Diesel Loco Shed, Sabarmati
 Diesel Loco Shed, Ratlam
 Diesel Loco Shed, Gandhidham
 Diesel Loco Shed, Mhow (MG loco shed)
 Diesel Loco Shed, Pratapnagar (NG loco shed)

See also

 Zones and divisions of Indian Railways
 All India Station Masters' Association (AISMA)

References

Further reading

External links 
 Official site
 Western railway Suburban Timetable (Mumbai Zone) 2017 Edition
 Detailed Mumbai Local Train Time Table
 Detailed Mumbai Local Train Time Table (Mobile)
 Official Western Railway Mumbai Suburban Timetables

1951 establishments in Bombay State
 
Zones of Indian Railways